Vivus is a small pharmaceutical company headquartered in Campbell, California, working in obesity, sleep, and sexual health.  Vivus is developing an erectile dysfunction drug, Avanafil, that has completed Phase 3 clinical trials. The drug has been approved for use by the FDA, and will be sold under the trademark name Stendra.  Stendra is the first and only oral ED treatment approved to be taken approximately 15 minutes before sexual activity.

A documentary movie "Orgasm Inc." was made at Vivus in 2009 to document the process of creating a treatment for female sexual arousal disorder (FSD).

Vivus also developed an obesity drug, Qnexa (now called Qsymia), a combination of phentermine and topiramate,  two existing weight-loss drugs. On July 17, 2012, The U.S. Food and Drug Administration approved Qsymia (phentermine and topiramate extended-release), made by Vivus, as an addition to a reduced-calorie diet and exercise for chronic weight management. The drug was approved for use in adults with a body mass index (BMI) of 30 or greater (obese) or adults with a BMI of 27 or greater (overweight) who have at least one weight-related condition such as high blood pressure (hypertension), type 2 diabetes, or high cholesterol (dyslipidemia).

In 2016, the company was ranked #23 on the  Deloitte Fast 500 North America list.

In 2020, the company filed for bankruptcy protection.

References

External links

Companies formerly listed on the Nasdaq
Companies based in Campbell, California
Pharmaceutical companies of the United States
Health care companies based in California
Companies that filed for Chapter 11 bankruptcy in 2020